Janos Kirz (born 1937) is a Hungarian-American physicist, Professor emeritus at Stony Brook University, and pioneer of X-ray microscopy.

Biography
Kirz was born in Budapest, Hungary and emigrated to the United States following the Hungarian Revolution of 1956. He studied physics at the University of California, Berkeley and after getting his PhD in 1963, he spent a year as a postdoc at CEA in Saclay. In 1968 Kirz took a position at Stony Brook University where he was appointed professor in 1973.

Research

Kirz's work has focused on Soft X-ray microscopy and the development and use of zone plates.

Awards

 1970 - Alfred P. Sloan Fellowship
 1985 - Guggenheim Fellowship
 2005 - Arthur H. Compton Award from the Advanced Photon Source for "Pioneering and developing the field of x-ray microscopy using Fresnel zone plates". Shared with Günter Schmahl.

Publications

References 

1937 births
Living people
American people of Hungarian descent
American physicists
University of California, Berkeley alumni
Scientists from Budapest
Stony Brook University faculty
Fellows of the American Physical Society